Aaliyah Alicia Alleyne (born 11 November 1994) is a Barbadian cricketer who plays as a right-arm medium bowler. In October 2019, she was named in the West Indies squad for their series against India. She made her Women's One Day International (WODI) debut for the West Indies against India on 1 November 2019. She made her Women's Twenty20 International (WT20I) debut for the West Indies, also against India, on 9 November 2019. In January 2020, she was named in West Indies' squad for the 2020 ICC Women's T20 World Cup in Australia. In May 2021, Alleyne was awarded with a central contract from Cricket West Indies. She plays domestic cricket for Barbados and Barbados Royals, as well as spending one season with Durham in 2016.

In October 2021, she was named in the West Indies team for the 2021 Women's Cricket World Cup Qualifier tournament in Zimbabwe. In February 2022, she was named in the West Indies team for the 2022 Women's Cricket World Cup in New Zealand. In July 2022, she was named in the Barbados team for the cricket tournament at the 2022 Commonwealth Games in Birmingham, England.

References

External links

1994 births
Living people
Barbadian women cricketers
West Indian women cricketers
West Indies women One Day International cricketers
West Indies women Twenty20 International cricketers
Durham women cricketers
Barbados Royals (WCPL) cricketers
Cricketers at the 2022 Commonwealth Games
Commonwealth Games competitors for Barbados
Barbados women Twenty20 International cricketers